Noël del Bello (born 25 December 1942 in Nantua) is a French former racing driver.

References

1942 births
Living people
French racing drivers
24 Hours of Le Mans drivers
World Sportscar Championship drivers
Sportspeople from Ain
People from Nantua